J. Richard Peet (born 16 April 1940 in Southport, England) is a retired professor of human geography at the Graduate School of Geography at Clark University in Worcester MA, USA.  Peet received a BSc (Economics) from the London School of Economics, an M.A. from the University of British Columbia, and moved to the USA in the mid-1960s to complete a PhD in Geography from the University of California, Berkeley.  He began teaching at Clark University shortly after completing his PhD from Berkeley, and has remained there with secondments in Australia, Sweden and New Zealand.  He is married to geographer Elaine Hartwick and lives in central Massachusetts.

Scholarly contributions
Peet’s areas of interest include social and economic geography, the geography of power, political ecology, liberation ecology, development theory, geography of consciousness and rationality, philosophy and social theory, and critical policy studies.

Peet’s doctoral research applied von Thunen’s theories to the global expansion of commercial agriculture.  However much of his later work was inspired by living in the racially and socially charged situation in America during the 1960s.  His early books and articles helped define the field of radical and critical geography.  Peet has written extensively on a variety of topics. Along with other authors such as David Harvey he was part of a movement of radical geographers that have drawn on Marxist theory and techniques. He uses the techniques of political economy, looking for interconnections and processes at a variety of scales and over time.  Peet believed that geography must do more than simply provide explanations and descriptions of problems studied, but rather attempt to propose alternatives.

During the 1980s and 1990s Peet's focus shifted to the politics and ecology of international development, particularly the systematic underdevelopment of nations peripheral to the capitalist west. His work is critical of neo-liberal development theory and global governance institutions such as the International Monetary Fund, the World Bank and the World Trade Organization.  He was a supporter of the socialist revolution in Grenada, working there prior to the US invasion in 1983.

Peet founded the radical journal of geography, Antipode, in 1970 and was an editor until 1985.  He co-edited Economic Geography from 1992-1998. In 2008 he founded a new independent journal, Human Geography: a new radical journal, free of the influence of large publishing houses. He is now working on a new book on global finance capital.

Appointments
 1967-1972 Assistant Professor, Clark University, Worcester, Massachusetts
 1972-1983 Associate Professor, Clark University, Worcester, Massachusetts
 1983–2019 Professor, Clark University, Worcester, Massachusetts

Other appointments
 1978-1980 Senior Research Fellow, Research School of Pacific Studies, Australian National University, Canberra
 1982-1985 Senior Research Fellow, Beijer Institute, Royal Swedish Academy of Sciences
 1998 Visiting Professor, University of the Witwatersrand, Johannesburg, South Africa
 2004 and 2012 Visiting Erskine Fellow, University of Canterbury, Christchurch, New Zealand

Honours
Lifetime Achievement Award, American Association of Geographers, 2018

Publications

Books

 Global Political Ecology edited with Paul Robbins and Michael Watts, London: Routledge 2010
 India’s New Economic Policy edited with Waquar Ahmed and Amitabh Kundu, London: Routledge 2010
 Unholy Trinity: The IMF, World Bank and WTO re-written and updated, London: Zed Press, 2009
 Theories of Development: Arguments, Contentions, Alternatives with Elaine Hartwick, New York: Guilford Press 2009
 Geography of Power: The Making of Global Economic Policy, London: Zed Press, 2007.
 Unholy Trinity: The IMF, World Bank, and WTO Zed Press, 2003.
 Theories of Development with Elaine Hartwick, Guilford, 1999, 2002.
 Modern Geographical Thought Blackwell, 1998.
 Liberation Ecologies: Environment, Development, Social Movements (edited with Michael Watts) Routledge, 1996; second revised edition, 2004.
 Global Capitalism: Theories of Societal Development Routledge: 1991.
 New Models in Geography: The Political Economy Approach (2 Volumes) edited with Nigel Thrift. Unwin Hyman, 1989.
 International Capitalism and Industrial Restructuring: a critical analysis. Allen & Unwin. 1987.
 Radical Geography: Alternative Viewpoints on Contemporary Social Issues edited. Maaroufa Press, 1977.

Articles
 "Perverse Expertise and the Social Unconscious in the Making of Crisis". In: Meusburger P., Werlen B., Suarsana L. (eds) Knowledge and Action. Springer, Cham. 89-97. 2017
 "Capital in the 21st century: Economics as usual" Geoforum 65: 301-303 (2015)
 "Comparative Policy Analysis: Introduction" Human Geography 6 (2) (2013): 1-10
 "Contradictions of Finance Capitalism" Monthly Review 63 (2011): 18-32
 “Marxism in the future of Nepal” Republica 2010-01-01. http://www.myrepublica.com/portal/index.php?action=news_details&news_id=13511
 “Making Sense of Globalization” (with E. Hartwick and I Chatterjee), in A Compendium of Economic Geography, London: Sage. ed R Lee, A Leyshon, L McDowell and P. Sunley (2010).
 “Ten Pages that Changed the World: Deconstructing Ricardo” Human Geography 2(1): 81-95(www.hugeog.com)
 “Global Governance”, “Development: Dependency” (with E Hartwick) and “Radical Geography” and “International Organisations” International Encyclopedia of Human Geography Oxford: Elsevier 2009
 “Global Development and Finance Institutions” and “Development Governance” in P.A. O’Hara (ed), International Encyclopedia of Public Policy. Volume 2: Economic Policy, GPERU: Perth, 2009: 139-151 and 299-309. http://pohara.homestead.com/Encyclopedia/Volume-2.pdf
 “Madness and Civilization: Global Financial Capitalism and the Anti-Poverty Discourse” Human Geography, 1, 1 (2008): 82-91 (www.hugeog.com)
 "Deconstructing Free Trade: From Epistemic Communities to Ideological Communities in Struggle” Transactions Institute of British Geographers 32 (2007): 576-580
 Review Article “Nepal's Geography of Underdevelopment” Monthly Review 2007. 59(6): 52-58
 “Imaginarios de Desenvolvimento” in B. Mancano Fernandes, M. Inez Medeiros Marques and J. C. Suzuki, Geografia Agraria: Teoria e Poder São Paulo: Editora Expressao Popular 2007. pp. 19–37
 "Neoliberalism and Nature: The Case of the WTO"(with E. Hartwick), Annals of the Academy of Social and Behavioral Sciences, 2003.
 "Ideology, Discourse and the Geography of Hegemony: From Socialist to Neoliberal Development in Post-Apartheid South Africa" Antipode 2003. 34:54-84.
 "Neoliberalism in South Africa" Globalization, the Third World State and Poverty Alleviation in the Twenty-First Century, ed B. Ikubolajeh Logan. London: Ashgate, 2002.
 "Poststructural Thought Policing" (with Elaine Hartwick) Economic Geography, 78,1 (2002), 87-88.
 "There is such a thing as Culture" Antipode 34,2 (2002).
 "Neoliberalism or Democratic Development?" Review of International Political Economy (2001), 329-343.
 "La Dialectique Spatiale, la geographie Nietschenne, et les politiques de la difference" ("Spatial Dialectics, Nietzschean Geography and the Politics of Difference") in G. Benko (ed.) Geographie, Economie, Societé 3,2 (2001), 369-79.
 "Teaching Global Society" Radical Teacher 62 (2001), pp. 8–10.
 "La Production Culturelle de Forms Economiques" in J-F Staszak et al. (eds) Geographies Anglo-Saxonnes Paris: Belin (2001), pp. 90–204.
 "Celebrating Thirty Years of Radical Geography" Environment and Planning A. Vol.27 (2000).
 "Culture, Imaginary and Rationality in Regional Economic Development" Environment and Planning A Vol. 27 (2000), 1215-1234.
 "Les Regions de la Difference, Les Espaces de la nouveaute: Aspects Culturels de la Theorie de la Regulation" ("Regions of Difference, Spaces of the New: Cultural Aspects of Regulation Theory") Geographie, Economie, Societé 1 (1999), 7-24.
 "Culture, Consumption and Experience in Global Capitalism" in Proceedings 23rd Annual Third World Conference 1998.
 "The Cultural Construction of Economic Forms" in Roger Lee and Jane Wills, Geographies of Economies London: Arnold 1997.
 "Social Theory, Postmodernism and the Critique of Development" in G.B. Benko and U. Strohmeyer (Eds) Space and Social Theory Blackwell, 1997.
 "Re-Encountering Development as Discourse", New Political Economy (1997) 2, 2 341-347.
 "Spatial Dialectics, Nietzschean Geography and the Politics of Difference" in G. Benko (Ed.) Espace et Postmodernité Paris: L'Harmattan 1997.
 "The Postmodern Critique of Development" in Anpege: Lugar, Formacao, Socioespacial Mundo São Paulo. 1996 (in Portuguese).
 "The Cultural Production of Economic Rationality in New England" 1996 NESTVAL Proceedings.
 "Discursive Idealism in the ‘Landscape as Text' School" The Professional Geographer 1996.
 "A Sign Taken for History: Daniel Shays Memorial in Petersham, Massachusetts" Annals, Association of American Geographers 86, 1 (1996), 21-43.
 "Discourse, Text, Location Theory" Economic Geography 70, 3 (1994), 297-302.
 "Mapas do Mundo no fim da Historia" ("Maps of the World at the End of History") in Milton Santos et al. (Eds), O Novo Mapa do Mund Fim de Secula E Globalizacao São Paulo, Brazil: 1993, 46-65.
 "Introduction: Development Theory and Environment in an Age of Market Triumphalism"(with Michael Watts), Economic Geography 69, 3 (1993), 227-253.

References

Further reading
 Audrey Kobayashi: Peet, R., International Encyclopedia of Human Geography, Rob Kitchin and Nigel Thrift (eds.), 2009, Elsevier, pp. 114–115.
 Steinberg, Philip E. "Peet, Richard (1940-)." Encyclopedia of Geography. Ed. Barney Warf. Thousand Oaks, CA: SAGE, 2010. 2145. SAGE Reference Online. Web. 6 Feb. 2012

External links
 Faculty Biography
 Curriculum Vitae

British geographers
British expatriates in Canada
British emigrants to the United States
Alumni of the London School of Economics
University of British Columbia alumni
University of California, Berkeley alumni
American geographers
Clark University faculty
1940 births
Living people
Political ecologists
Economic geographers
Political geographers